John Paul Hammerschmidt Lake is a reservoir on the Arkansas River and an integral part of the McClellan–Kerr Arkansas River Navigation System (MKARNS). It was formed by constructing the James W. Trimble Lock & Dam 13 across the river, near the city of Barling, Arkansas and extends upriver  to W. D. Mayo Lock and Dam, which is located inside the state of Oklahoma. Although the Trimble facility was completed in 1969, it was not allowed to pass commercial barges until 1971, when upstream facilities were completed.

The lake also serves as the boundary between Crawford and Sebastian Counties, Arkansas, as well as dividing Van Buren, the county seat of Crawford County, and Fort Smith, the county seat of Sebastian County. The Arkansas-Oklahoma State Line is the western boundary of both Arkansas counties. Approximately one half of the lake's length lies within Oklahoma, where the lake separates Sequoyah County, Oklahoma from LeFlore County, Oklahoma.

Poteau River, an Arkansas River tributary which flows north in Oklahoma, crosses the Arkansas-Oklahoma state line immediately southwest of Fort Smith and discharges into Hammersmith Lake.

References 

Lakes of Arkansas
Lakes of Oklahoma
Infrastructure completed in 1969
Geography of Crawford County, Arkansas
Geography of Sebastian County, Arkansas
Geography of McIntosh County, Oklahoma
Geography of Sequoyah County, Oklahoma
1969 establishments in Arkansas
1969 establishments in Oklahoma